Maple Hill Cemetery (also known as Evergreen Cemetery) is located on Holly Street, north of the center of Helena, Arkansas. The cemetery was established in 1865, and is laid out in the rural cemetery style which was popular in the mid-19th century. It departs from the norms of this style in retaining a largely rectilinear layout despite having parklike features. The cemetery's entrance is through an elaborately-decorated wrought iron archway, whose posts were given in 1914, and whose arch was given in 1975. The largest monument in the cemetery is the Coolidge Monument, placed by Henry P. Coolidge on the family plot, which is at the highest point of section 3; the monument is a granite column  in height, with a life-size sculpture of Coolidge on top.

Most of the cemetery (an area of  excluding the then-empty section 6) was listed on the National Register of Historic Places in 2000.  Helena's Confederate Cemetery, located in the southwest corner of this cemetery, is also separately listed on the National Register.

Notable burials include US Representative James M. Hanks (1833–1909) and Confederate generals Thomas C. Hindman (1828–1868) and James C. Tappan (1825–1906).

See also

 National Register of Historic Places listings in Phillips County, Arkansas

References

External links
 
 

1865 establishments in Arkansas
Arkansas Heritage Trails System
Beaux-Arts architecture in Arkansas
Buildings and structures completed in 1865
Buildings and structures in Phillips County, Arkansas
Cemeteries on the National Register of Historic Places in Arkansas
Historic districts on the National Register of Historic Places in Arkansas
National Register of Historic Places in Phillips County, Arkansas
Cemeteries established in the 1860s